Vapa Cove is the 1.65 km wide cove indenting for 1.1 km the west coast of Liège Island in the Palmer Archipelago, Antarctica.  It is entered north of Polezhan Point and south of Disilitsa Point, and has its head fed by Pleystor Glacier.

The cove is named after Vapa Peak in Rila Mountain, Bulgaria.

Location
British mapping in 1980.

Maps
 British Antarctic Territory.  Scale 1:200000 topographic map.  DOS 610 Series, Sheet W 64 62.  Directorate of Overseas Surveys, UK, 1980.
 Antarctic Digital Database (ADD). Scale 1:250000 topographic map of Antarctica. Scientific Committee on Antarctic Research (SCAR), 1993–2016.

References
 Bulgarian Antarctic Gazetteer. Antarctic Place-names Commission. (details in Bulgarian, basic data in English)
 Vapa Cove. SCAR Composite Antarctic Gazetteer.

External links
 Vapa Cove. Copernix satellite image

Coves of Graham Land
Bulgaria and the Antarctic
Liège Island